Gabriel Stelian Mureșan (born 13 February 1982) is a Romanian former professional footballer who played as a defensive midfielder. In September 2020 he was elected Mayor of the commune where he spent his childhood, Apold after receiving 63.09% of the votes, while running for PNL.

International career
Gabriel Mureșan made his debut for Romania, when coach Victor Pițurcă used him as a substitute in order to replace Dorel Stoica in the 79th minute of a Euro 2008 qualification game against Slovenia which ended with a 2–1 victory. His second game for the national team was in a 2–2 against France at the 2010 World Cup qualifiers, he also played in three games at the Euro 2012 qualifiers. He has a total of 9 international appearances.

Honours
CFR Cluj 
Liga I: 2007–08, 2009–10, 2011–12
Cupa României: 2007–08, 2008–09, 2009–10
Supercupa României: 2009, 2010
ASA Târgu Mureș
Supercupa României: 2015

References

External links

1982 births
Living people
People from Sighișoara
Romanian footballers
Romania international footballers
Association football midfielders
CS Gaz Metan Mediaș players
ACF Gloria Bistrița players
CFR Cluj players
ASA 2013 Târgu Mureș players
Liga I players
FC Tom Tomsk players
Russian Premier League players
Romanian expatriate footballers
Expatriate footballers in Russia
Romanian expatriate sportspeople in Russia
National Liberal Party (Romania) politicians
Romanian sportsperson-politicians